Below is a list of covered bridges in Washington state. There are five authentic covered bridges in the U.S. state of Washington, though none of them are historic.  A covered bridge is considered authentic not due to its age, but by its construction. An authentic bridge is constructed using trusses rather than other methods such as stringers, a popular choice for non-authentic covered bridges.

Extant

Former

See also

 List of bridges on the National Register of Historic Places in Washington (state)
 World Guide to Covered Bridges

References

External links

 National Society for the Preservation of Covered Bridges
 Only in Your State article about the state's covered bridges

Washington (state)
 
covered bridges
Bridges, covered